Axel Hansen (18 January 1909 – 15 August 1952) was a Danish footballer. He played in two matches for the Denmark national football team from 1927 to 1935.

References

External links
 

1909 births
1952 deaths
Danish men's footballers
Denmark international footballers
Place of birth missing
Association footballers not categorized by position